A cheesemelter is a cooking device used primarily in commercial restaurant kitchens. Powered by direct flame or electricity, these long, toaster-like appliances allow cooks to put finishing touches on dishes, especially those topped with shredded cheese.

It is closely related to the Salamander broiler though it offers more fine control for browning a dish at the end of the cooking cycle. It is also less expensive and easier to use than a salamander.

References

Cheese
Cooking appliances